The 1832 United States presidential election in Mississippi took place between November 2 and December 5, 1832, as part of the 1832 United States presidential election. Voters chose four representatives, or electors to the Electoral College, who voted for President and Vice President.

Mississippi voted unanimously for the Democratic Party candidate, Andrew Jackson.

Results

References

Mississippi
1832
1832 Mississippi elections